Bertha Badt-Strauss (7 December 1885 – 20 February 1970) was a German writer and Zionist. She wrote for numerous Jewish publications in Berlin and the United States, and edited and translated the works of many other writers.

Biography
Bertha Badt was born in 1885 in Breslau to Benno Badt, a philologist, and Martha (née Guttman), a teacher. She studied literature and philosophy in Breslau, Berlin and Munich, and with her thesis on Annette von Droste-Hülshoff, became one of the first women in Prussia to receive a doctoral degree. She lived in Berlin with her husband , an educator, from 1913, and their son Albrecht was born in 1921. Shortly after Albrecht's birth, Bertha developed multiple sclerosis.

Badt-Strauss was a Zionist and an active member of the Jewish community in Berlin.
She was also a prolific editor and translator of works by other writers, including Droste-Hülshoff, Achim von Arnim, Moses Mendelssohn, Fanny Lewald, Hermann Cohen, Rahel Varnhagen, Heinrich Heine, Süßkind von Trimberg, Profiat Duran and Leon of Modena. 
She wrote a book-length unpublished biography of German writer Elise Reimarus.

Badt-Strauss migrated from Nazi Germany to the United States in 1939. She settled in Shreveport, Louisiana, where her husband was a professor at Centenary College of Louisiana. She published a biography of the Zionist Jessie Sampter titled White Fire: The Life and Works of Jessie Sampter, and continued to write for a variety of Jewish-American publications: Aufbau, The Jewish Way, The Menorah Journal, The Reconstructionist, The National Jewish Monthly, Hadassah Newsletter and Women's League Outlook. She died in 1970 in Chapel Hill, North Carolina.

References

1885 births
1970 deaths
Writers from Wrocław
20th-century German writers
20th-century German women writers
Jewish American writers
Jewish women writers
Jewish emigrants from Nazi Germany to the United States
German Zionists